Somalamma, also called Somanalamma and Somanayaki Amma, is a Hindu devi (goddess) who protects soma and gives soma to her devotees to relieve their health and mental symptoms.

Soma 

Soma, or Haoma (Avestan), from Proto-Indo-Iranian *sauma-, was an important ritual drink for early Indo-Iranian peoples, and the later Vedic and greater Persian cultures. It is frequently mentioned in the Rigveda, which contains many hymns praising its energising qualities. In the Avesta, haoma has an entire Yasht dedicated to it.

In the Vedas, soma is personified as sacred and divine (deva). The god, the drink, and the plant probably referred to the same entity, or at least the difference was ambiguous. In this aspect, soma is similar to the Greek ambrosia (cognate to amrita); it is what the gods drink and what makes them deities. Indra and Agni are portrayed as consuming Soma in copious quantities. The consumption of soma by human beings was probably under the belief that it bestowed divine qualities on them.

Temples 
The goddess Somalamma temples are mainly governed by the Goud communities. Every year, there is a gathering of many of her devotees in various temples in Andhra Pradesh.

 Somalamma temple, Gaigalapadu, Kakinada
 Somalamma temple Rajamundry-533103
 Somalamma temple Jangareddy Gudem, West Godavari
 Somajiguda, Hyderabad
 Somaram, Somavaram, Warangal
 Somaram, Somavaram, Nalgonda
 Somarajapuram, Kothuru, Srikakulam
 Somavaram, Chatrai mandal, Krishna dt
 Somavaram Nandigama mandal
 Somavarappadu, Pedaparupudi mandal
 Somasundarapalem, Tenali, Guntur dt
 Somavaram, Wyra mandal, Khammam
 Somaram, Saidapur mandal, Karim Nagar
 Somanpalle, Jagityal mandal
 Somaram Tidwai, Nizamabad dt
 Somapuram, Gadivemula, Kurnool
 Somalavandlapalli, Talupula, Ananthapur
 Somalapuram, Dhirehal
 Somaghtta, Chilamattu
 Somapuram, Pedduru, Chittoor
 Somanadhapuram, Penumur mandal
 Somalagadda village, Madanapalle mandal
 Somarajulapalle, Kvpalle mandal

See also 
Renuka

References 

Hindu goddesses
Soma (drink)